David Lawrence Galloway (born February 16, 1959) is an American former college and professional football player who was a defensive end in the National Football League (NFL) for ten seasons during the 1980s and early 1990s.  Galloway played college football for the University of Florida, and earned All-American honors.  A second-round pick in the 1982 NFL Draft, he played professionally for the St. Louis/Phoenix Cardinals and the Denver Broncos of the NFL.

Early life 

Galloway was born in Tampa, Florida in 1959.  Both of Galloway's parents died before he was 10 years old, and he was cared for by his two older sisters.  He attended Brandon High School in Brandon, Florida, where he was a standout high school football player for the Brandon Eagles.  Galloway was six feet, three inches tall and weighed 225 pounds in high school; he was a dominating athlete in basketball, football and track.  As a senior for the Eagles in 1977, he was an all-state, prep All-American defensive lineman in football, led Hillsborough County in basketball dunks, and helped the Brandon Eagles to an 18–2 conference basketball title, and threw the shot and discus for the track team.

College career 

Galloway accepted an athletic scholarship to attend the University of Florida in Gainesville, Florida, where he played defensive end and defensive tackle for coach Doug Dickey and coach Charley Pell's Florida Gators football teams from 1978 to 1981.  During Galloway's junior season in 1980, he was a member of the Gators team that posted the biggest one-year turnaround in the history of NCAA Division I football—from 0–10–1 in 1979 to an 8–4 bowl team in 1980.

He was recognized as a second-team All-Southeastern Conference (SEC) selection and an honorable mention All-American in 1980.  As a senior team captain in 1981, Galloway was a first-team All-SEC selection, and a Football Writers Association of America first-team All-American.  He was later inducted into the University of Florida Athletic Hall of Fame as a "Gator Great."  In one of a series of articles written for The Gainesville Sun in 2006, the newspaper's sports editors rated him as No. 48 among the top 100 players of the Florida Gators' first 100 seasons.

Professional career 

He played in ninety-nine games, started seventy-six of them, and recorded thirty-eight quarterback sacks and five recovered fumbles in his ten-season NFL career.

Life after football 

Galloway is married, and he and his wife Josie have led a marriage ministry together for seven years.  They have three sons.  Galloway currently works as a licensed real estate agent in Miami/Fort Lauderdale, Florida area.

See also 

 1981 College Football All-America Team
 Florida Gators football, 1970–79
 Florida Gators football, 1980–89
 List of Florida Gators football All-Americans
 List of Florida Gators in the NFL Draft
 List of University of Florida alumni
 List of University of Florida Athletic Hall of Fame members

References

Bibliography 
 Carlson, Norm, University of Florida Football Vault: The History of the Florida Gators, Whitman Publishing, LLC, Atlanta, Georgia (2007).  .
 Golenbock, Peter, Go Gators!  An Oral History of Florida's Pursuit of Gridiron Glory, Legends Publishing, LLC, St. Petersburg, Florida (2002).  .
 Hairston, Jack, Tales from the Gator Swamp: A Collection of the Greatest Gator Stories Ever Told, Sports Publishing, LLC, Champaign, Illinois (2002).  .
 McCarthy, Kevin M.,  Fightin' Gators: A History of University of Florida Football, Arcadia Publishing, Mount Pleasant, South Carolina (2000).  .
 Nash, Noel, ed., The Gainesville Sun Presents The Greatest Moments in Florida Gators Football, Sports Publishing, Inc., Champaign, Illinois (1998).  .

External links 
  Words of Life – Official website of the Words of Life ministry.

1959 births
Living people
Players of American football from Tampa, Florida
American football defensive linemen
Florida Gators football players
All-American college football players
St. Louis Cardinals (football) players
Phoenix Cardinals players
Denver Broncos players
Street ministry
Sportspeople from Hillsborough County, Florida
People from Brandon, Florida